The Vice of Hope is a 2018 Italian drama film directed by Edoardo De Angelis. It was screened in the Contemporary World Cinema section at the 2018 Toronto International Film Festival.

Cast
 Pina Turco as Maria
 Nancy Colarusso as Virgin
 Massimiliano Rossi as Pengue

References

External links
 

2018 films
2018 drama films
Italian drama films
2010s Italian-language films
2010s Italian films